2PM (romanized; Tupiem) is a South Korean boy band formed by JYP Entertainment. The group is composed of six members: Jun. K (formerly known as Junsu), Nichkhun, Taecyeon, Wooyoung, Junho and Chansung. Originally a seven-piece group, former member Jaebeom (now known professionally as Jay Park) left the group in 2009 due to controversies that stemmed from his posts on MySpace.

Through the documentary series Hot Blood Men, Korean musician Park Jin-young formed an eleven-member band known as One Day. Eventually, the band was split into the hip hop group 2PM and a similar but independent group known as 2AM. 2PM debuted with the song "10 Out of 10" (lit. "10 Points Out of 10 Points"), which showcased their acrobatic dance styles. They then achieved their first number 1 single with "Again & Again". Both singles were featured on their first studio album, 01:59PM, which was released in 2009. The band went on to release another Korean album, Hands Up, in 2011. They made their Japanese debut later that year with Republic of 2PM. The group enjoyed significant commercial success with their subsequent albums; Grown (2013), Go Crazy (2014), No.5 (2015), and Gentlemen's Game (2016), each of which peaked within the top 3.

Following touring for Gentlemen's Game, the group took an official hiatus in July 2017 due to mandatory military service. Following the members' discharge, 2PM returned with their seventh studio album Must in June 2021.

History

Pre-debut
The members of 2PM all auditioned (except Nichkhun, who was scouted) to become part of JYP Entertainment. Some members already had experience in the entertainment industry, including Jun. K, who had won several singing competitions. Ok Taecyeon, Lee Junho and Hwang Chansung had participated in the show SuperStar Survival. Some of the members had previously lived in the United States: former leader Jaebeom in the Seattle area, Nichkhun in Southern California, while Taecyeon spent seven years in Massachusetts before returning to Korea.

Originally, the members of 2PM were part of a larger group known as One Day. A documentary called Hot Blood Men captured the group's training days. In this documentary, former member Jaebeom finished at the top spot and received the most fan votes. It also featured the elimination of three trainees from the group: Lee Swichi, Jeong Jinwoon, and Yoon Doo-joon were all cut. However, Jinwoon replaced Im Daehun upon the latter's withdrawal. By the end of the training process, One Day had been reduced to an eleven-member group. The band was then split into four-member ballad group 2AM and seven-member hip-hop group 2PM.

2008–2010: Debut and early success, Jaebeom's departure 
While most Korean boy bands at the time adopted a "pretty boy" or kkonminam image, 2PM constructed a tough and macho beast-like image when they made their debut. By emphasizing their masculine images, 2PM is known for creating the "jimseung-dol" (which translates to beast/animal idol in Korean) phenomenon in 2008. Jaebeom was chosen to serve as the group's leader, as he was the oldest member and also the one who all the members acknowledged as the most talented one. He played key roles in several of the band's early singles and associated music videos.

2PM debuted with their single album Hottest Time of the Day on August 29, 2008. The album consisted a total of 6 tracks, including its lead single "10 Out of 10". The group made their debut live performance with a performance of "10 Out of 10" on M Countdown on September 4, 2008. The following month, the group released a winter special version of their song "Only You", a B-side from their debut mini album. Concurrently, 2PM hosted the third season of Korean variety show Idol Army.

On April 16, 2009, the group released their second mini album, 2:00PM Time For Change, which they began promoting that month with the lead single "Again and Again". This comeback was met with commercial success, with "Again and Again" placing at number one on various music charts including Cyworld, Hanteo, Melon, Mnet, and Muse. The following month, they won their first Mutizen Song award on M Countdown, followed by two more and a Music Bank award. On June 11, 2PM began promotions for their song "Niga Mipda" (lit. I Hate You) on M Countdown. 2PM then achieved first place on the M Countdown and Music Bank charts with "Niga Mipda" later in July and on July 30, the group won the 'Only One Song' award on M Countdown. At this time, 2PM also starred in the popular Korean variety show Wild Bunny.

A controversy regarding Jaebeom emerged when on September 4, 2009, articles surfaced on the internet regarding his posts from 2005 made on his personal Myspace account, in which he expressed his dislike for Korea while he was still a trainee for JYP Entertainment. These posts, leaked by a netizen who hacked his Myspace account, were taken out of context and severely misinterpreted by the Korean media. Jaebeom issued an apology regarding this matter. Although some netizens demanded that Jaebeom should be forced out of 2PM, JYP Entertainment CEO Park Jin-young stated on September 7 that he lent the singer a vote of confidence, suggesting that Jaebeom would remain in the group. However, on the following day, Jaebeom announced on his official Fancafé that he would leave the group and return to the United States for a while to calm the situation. He planned to return to school and improve his understanding of music. At the same time, he apologized to his fellow band members for not being a good leader and older brother for them. He also promised to come back as a better person. Park Jin-young confirmed that 2PM would continue on as a six-member group. Due to the sensitive topic of Jaebeom's departure, 2PM withdrew for several weeks from their appearances on variety shows.

Despite the controversy, the group went ahead with the release of their first studio album. Known as 01:59PM, the album was released on November 10, 2009. In response to lingering questions regarding Jaebeom's future, Park Jin-young announced on the day after the release of 01:59PM that Jaebeom could return to 2PM if he wished to make a comeback, although the singer's return was not imminent. In support of Jaebeom, the six remaining 2PM members decided to equally split their income from their first album with him. The album included tracks voiced by Jaebeom, although his face was excluded from the cover. The group finished re-filming their music video for the album's lead single "Heartbeat", without Jaebeom in October 2009. The group then began promotional activities for the album on a variety of music shows, including Mnet's O Good Concert, KBS' Music Bank, MBC's Music Core and SBS' Inkigayo in November 2009.

A week and a half after the album's release, 2PM performed at the Mnet Asian Music Awards on November 21, 2009 and took home the awards for Best Male Group and Artist of the Year, the latter being one of the three most prestigious awards of the show. The group paid homage to Jaebeom during their performance of "Again & Again". During the performance, a spotlight shone over Jaebeom's usual position in the dance formation, and his vocals played over the speakers without being replaced.

In late November 2009, after two weeks of promotional activities for 1:59PM, 2PM earned their first #1 on a TV music show (KBS Music Bank's "K-Chart") since the album's release, with their single "Heartbeat", which went on to take #1 on the K-Chart for three more weeks. In addition, "Heartbeat" achieved the Mutizen Triple Crown song award on SBS' Inkigayo by being the #1 song on the program's "Take 7" chart for three weeks, the maximum amount of time for which a nominated song is eligible to win. On December 30, 2009, at Korean Broadcasting System (KBS)'s end of the year Music Festival, "Again & Again" was recognized as "Song of the Year", winning with 57,060 votes.

2PM's second single from 01:59PM was "Tired of Waiting". The song was performed live for the first time at the SBS Music Festival in December 2009. 2PM's promotion for the album ended with their performance on SBS' Inkigayo in January 2010.

In February 2010, JYP Entertainment announced that Jaebeom would not return to 2PM, as his contract with the company had been permanently terminated, with the agreement of all 6 members. A combined fan meeting and press conference was held two days later with the six remaining members of 2PM and JYP Entertainment CEO Choi Jungwook in attendance. Various 2PM fan sites were shut down immediately after the conference as a protest of Jaebeom's termination. The record label then announced that although 2PM would move forward with six members, a new leader would not be chosen to replace Jaebeom.

In April 2010, the band released Don't Stop Can't Stop, a mini-album consisting of six tracks. The group intended for the release to illustrate a stronger side of themselves than what was seen in their previous releases. The album was met with much success, with its lead song "Without U" ranking atop multiple Korean music charts. The group made their television performance comeback on Mnet's music program M Countdown in April 2010. In the same month, 2PM served as the opening act for nine Wonder Girls summer shows in the United States.In May 2010, 2PM also performed at the eighth annual Korea Times Music Festival in Los Angeles, California, and at the Dream Concert which was held in Seoul. In the same month, 2PM released the song "What's Your Celebration?", which is sampled from K'Naan's "Wavin' Flag", for the FIFA 2010 World Cup. It was announced that all proceeds from the sales of the song will go to the donation support headed by FIFA World Cup in South Africa.

On July 31, 2010, 2PM held their first solo concert "Don't Stop Can't Stop" at the Seoul Olympic Park Arena, with their labelmates 2AM and Miss A making guest appearances at the concert. The group held another concert date in Seoul on August 1, before moving to Busan on August 7–8, and holding two more encore concerts in Seoul on September 4–5 in line with the celebration of their second debut anniversary. It was reported that more than 12,000 fans attended 2PM's first concerts in Seoul.

In October 2010, 2PM released their fourth EP, Still 2:00PM, with the lead single "I'll Be Back" staying at number one for two consecutive weeks on KBS' Music Bank. On the following month, it was reported that Still 2:00PM debuted unexpectedly on the 13th spot of the Billboard's World Album-Chart even though no album promotions were made in the United States.

On October 18, 2PM won the "Most Popular Asian Singer" award at the 10th Annual Mandarin Music Honors held at the Wukesong Arena in China. They became the first Korean artist to be granted with the award, with the group performing their songs "Heartbeat" and "I'll Be Back" at the event.

2011–2012: Japanese debut and mainstream success 

2PM officially made their Japanese debut in December 2010 with their first live platinum showcase titled "2PM 1st Contact in JAPAN LIVE" in Japan at the Ryogoku Kokugikan Gymnasium, a place well known for sumo games.

In May 2011, 2PM released their debut Japanese single, "Take Off," which was featured as an ending song in the Blue Exorcist anime series. Afterwards, the group held their first Japanese concert tour, known as the "2PM 1st Japan Tour 2011 Take Off," which began in Sapporo on May 6 and ended a week later in Tokyo.

On March 9, 2011, 2PM released their first compilation album, All About 2PM, comprising tracks from the group's previously released albums Hottest Time of the Day, 2:00PM Time for Change, 01:59PM, Don't Stop Can't Stop, and Still 2:00PM. It was released for the Japanese market as a box set. The album debuted at number 26 on the Oricon Albums Chart, selling 4,502 copies in its first week.

On June 15, 2011, JYP Entertainment released the first teaser of 2PM's upcoming second studio album, which would be known as Hands Up. The album was released later that month on June 20. For the first time since the group's debut, the album featured two songs composed by 2PM members: "HOT" by Jun. K and "Give it to Me" by Junho. Promotions for the album was short and ended just one month after its release, allowing the group to further prepare for their future Japanese promotions and their upcoming "Hands Up Asia Tour." The following month, the 2PM Show began broadcasting in July 2011 on SBS's E!TV cable channel and featured all six members. It was the first time 2PM would emcee a program with their name on it.

In support of their album Hands Up, 2PM held the "Hands Up Asia Tour" beginning with two dates on September 2–3, 2011 at the Seoul Jamsil Gymnasium with over 15,000 fans in attendance. The concert tour continued with the group performing in different arenas in seven cities: Taipei, Jakarta, Singapore, Kuala Lumpur, Bangkok, Nanjing, and Hong Kong. When the group concluded the tour at the AsiaWorld Expo-Arena in Hong Kong, they had recorded a cumulative number of 160,000 fans who attended their concerts.

On November 30, 2011, 2PM released their first Japanese-language studio album, Republic of 2PM, which contained all of the group's previously-released Japanese singles and the Japanese version of their Korean single "Hands Up". In addition, the album consisted of five new songs including a track composed by Jun. K called "Hanarete Itemo" (離れていても, Even When We're Apart) which was dedicated for the group's Japanese fans. The album debuted at number 4 on the Oricon Weekly Albums Chart, reporting over 50,265 copies sold in its first week. From December 5 until 25, 2011, the group embarked on their "REPUBLIC OF 2PM" Japan Arena Tour, but with all 100,000 tickets being sold out in just one minute, JYP Entertainment announced an additional concert date to be held at Fukuoka. In conjunction with their arena tour, the group also held the "2PM Japan Debut 1st Anniversary Event" to an audience of 25,000 fans at Ryokoku in commemoration of their one-year anniversary since debuting in Japan.

In its annual sales report for the year 2011, Oricon announced that 2PM was the second best-selling new artist in Japan, being the highest-ranking Korean act beating out SHINee, and ranking just behind the Johnny & Associates group Kis-My-FT2. According to the report, 2PM reported revenue of over 990 million yen ($12.68 million) in singles, albums, and DVD sales.

On March 14, 2012, 2PM released their second compilation album, 2PM Best (2008–2011 in Korea), which consisted of 17 songs including the bonus tracks "Alive" and "Move On". The album reached its peak position of number 5 on the Oricon Album Chart, before staying in the chart for 14 weeks.

On May 22, 2012, 2PM released their third compilation album, 2PM Member's Selection, for the Korean market. The album reached a peak position atop the Gaon Album Chart, and sold 21,893 copies by the end of the year.

On May 24–25 and May 28–31, 2012, 2PM held their "Six Beautiful Days” concert at the Nippon Budokan in Tokyo, becoming the first Korean group to perform at the Budokan for six consecutive shows. This was then followed with the group releasing their fourth Japanese single "Beautiful” and a live concert DVD entitled “Arena Tour 2011 — Republic Of 2PM” on June 6. The single sold more than 73,529 copies on the day of its launch and managed to come in at second on Oricon's Daily Singles Chart, while the DVD charted atop in the music DVD segment of Oricon's Daily Chart and at number 2 in the Combined DVD Chart. In support of the release of "Beautiful," 2PM held a “Hi-Touch” event in Osaka on June 9 and then again in Tokyo on June 16. The group then made a performance at the MTV Music Awards Japan 2012 on June 23.

In April 2012, 2PM announced plans to release a documentary film with 2AM, to be known as Beyond The One Day, in Japan. The trailer for the film was released on April 13, with the film itself first being premiered on June 30, 2012.

2PM then held their second Asia-wide concert tour series, "What Time Is It?" beginning at the Mercedes Benz Arena in Shanghai on November 17, 2012, and going on to cover six cities: Jakarta, Taipei, Macau, Manila, Guangzhou, and Bangkok, before concluding with two concert dates held at the Jamsil Arena in Seoul on June 21–22, 2013.

2013–2014: Further success 

On February 13, 2013, the group released their second Japanese studio album, Legend of 2PM. The album consisted of 9 tracks including the previously-released singles "Beautiful" and "Masquerade". The singles "This Is Love" and "So Bad" were released digitally on iTunes on February 18–19 as a promotional single from the album. The album debuted atop the Oricon Albums Chart, selling 64,291 copies in its first week, and remained on the chart for nine weeks. 2PM then embarked on their "LEGEND OF 2PM" Japan Arena Tour from January 13 until February 24, 2013, covering the cities of Nagoya, Osaka, Tokyo, and Sapporo. This was soon followed up with a performance at the Tokyo Dome to a recorded attendance of over 110,000 people on April 20 to 21.

After more than a year, 2PM made their Korean comeback in May 2013 with their third Korean-language studio album, Grown. The group first revealed the music video teaser for the album's lead single, "Comeback When You Hear This Song", on May 2, 2013 through their official YouTube account. "Comeback When You Hear This Song" was then fully released on May 6, along with 10 other songs from the album. The album topped the Japan Tower Records pre-release chart upon release, overtaking the group's own Japanese single “Give Me Love” on May 5. Grown then became the group's second entry on the Billboard World Albums Chart, becoming their first Top 10 entry peaking at number 6, and remaining on the chart for three weeks. A second title track named "A.D.T.O.Y" was released on May 11, 2013, which was later recognized by Billboard magazine, ranking at number 13 in its "20 Best K-pop Songs of 2013: K-Town Picks" list.

In order to promote Grown, the group took part in the "2PM G+Star Zone" exhibition held at the Apgujeongrodeo Station from May 2 to July 31, 2013 as part of the "G+Dream Project" launched by the Gangnam-gu Office in order to support disadvantaged youth. They also made a promotional appearance on M Countdown on May 16 wherein they performed the two lead singles of their album.

On October 16, 2013, 2PM released their eighth Japanese single "Winter Games", which became the group's first chart-topper on the Billboard Japan Hot 100 on its issue dated November 2, 2013.

On January 29, 2014, 2PM released their third Japanese studio album, Genesis of 2PM, consisting of 9 new songs and including the previously-released singles "Give Me Love" and "Winter Games". The album debuted atop the Oricon Albums Chart, selling 63,212 copies in its first week, and remained on the chart for seven weeks. In support of the album, the group embarked on their "GENESIS OF 2PM" Japan Arena Tour held from January 27 until March 27, 2014, performing in 14 cities in Japan with a recorded attendance of over 150,000 people. At the conclusion of their concert tour in Tokyo, the group announced their Korean comeback.

During the filming of the music video of the group's upcoming comeback in April, a fire broke out on the set of the music video. Authorities stated that the fire was relatively small and had been controlled by the time that the first responders had arrived. All the members and their staff were confirmed to be unharmed. As a result, the group's comeback was postponed. Following the incident, the group first released teaser photos and other individual teasers which hinted on their comeback beginning August 31, and on September 10, 2PM released the music video of their single "Go Crazy!", the title track of their fourth Korean studio album of the same name. The album itself was then released in both physical and digital format on September 15, which was followed with the group's promotional performances on Club Octagon in Gangnam-gu, Seoul and their appearance on M Countdown. Go Crazy marked 2PM's third appearance on the Billboard World Albums Chart, peaking at number 7 on its chart issue dated October 4, 2014. On its chart issue dated on the same day, Billboard reported that 2PM also landed their second Japan Hot 100 chart topper with their Japanese single "Midaretemina".

In support of their latest album, 2PM then began their world tour, "Go Crazy! 2PM World Tour", with a concert to a sold-out Jamsil Arena in Seoul on October 3, 2014. The concert tour covered 12 cities in 5 countries: Seoul, Bangkok, Beijing, Newark, Rosemont, Grand Prairie, Los Angeles, Guangzhou, Nanjing, Hong Kong, Jakarta, and then concluding at the Mercedes-Benz Arena in Shanghai. With performances on major venues such as the Prudential Center, Rosemont Theatre, Verizon Theatre, and the Shrine Auditorium, the "Go Crazy" concert series marked the group's first solo performances in the United States, following their performances as opening acts for their labelmates Wonder Girls earlier in 2010.

2015–2019: Continued releases and group hiatus 

The group released their fourth Japanese studio album, 2PM of 2PM, on April 15, 2015. The album features 13 new songs as well as tracks from the group's single "Guilty Love". The album debuted atop the Oricon Albums Chart, selling over 62,705 copies in its first week, and remained on the chart for 10 weeks. From April 7 until May 31, 2014, 2PM embarked on their "2PM OF 2PM" Japan Arena Tour in support of their album, covering the cities of Osaka, Nagoya, Yokohama, and Tokyo and recording a total of over 150,000 people in attendance. An additional 13,000 people also attended the live concert viewing held in 50 movie theaters in 34 regions throughout Japan. At the conclusion of their arena tour, the group announced that they were preparing for a Korean comeback.

On June 15, 2015, 2PM released their fifth studio album, No.5.  Nine of the twelve songs on the album were written by the members, with the title song "My House" written by Jun K. The album performed well commercially, debuting atop the Gaon Album Chart, at number 14 on the Oricon Album Chart, and at number three on the Billboard World Albums Chart. By the end of 2015, it was reported that No.5 sold 62,618 copies in South Korea.

On April 27, 2016, the group released their fifth Japanese studio album, Galaxy of 2PM, which debuted atop the Oricon Album Chart and remained on the said chart for seven weeks. By the end of the year, the album had sold over 122,685 copies on Oricon. In support of the album, 2PM embarked on their "2PM ARENA TOUR 2016': GALAXY OF 2PM" which was held from April 13 to June 18, 2016, covering the cities of Nagoya, Fukuoka, Hokkaido, Tokyo and Osaka. All 15 concert dates were sold out, and at the conclusion of the tour, the group had recorded an attendance of 160,000 people with an additional 36,000 fans who attended the live viewing of the concert held in 134 movie theaters throughout Japan. The group then followed up with two concert dates held at the Tokyo Dome on October 26 to 27.

On September 3, 2016, member Junho posted the group's schedule for the coming week on his Instagram profile hinting at a comeback. The following day, the group celebrated their eight-year anniversary together, consequently teasing their next comeback by posting individual photos of each member on their official social media accounts. Their sixth studio album was released on September 13, titled Gentlemen's Game along with its lead single "Promise (I'll Be)". The album entered the Billboard World Albums Chart, peaking at number 11 and remaining on the chart for 2 weeks. Gentlemen's Game was the group's last album before the members began their mandatory military enlistment. 2PM then held a concert titled "6Nights" at the SK Olympic Handball Gymnasium on February 24–26, 2017 which was followed with a second set of concert dates on March 3–5 as the group's final concert series before its members began enlisting for their military service.

On January 31, 2018, five of the six members of 2PM signed their renewal to JYP Entertainment with Taecyeon's renewal to be discussed after serving his military service. The following day, JYP Entertainment appointed the members of 2PM as directors of external affairs as they were the most senior group in the company.

Jun. K also entered the military on May 8. Wooyoung enlisted on July 8, serving active duty. On July 25, it was announced that Taecyeon decided not to re-sign with JYP Entertainment, instead signing with 51K. However, he stated that he will continue promoting with 2PM.

Taecyeon completed his military service and was discharged on May 16, 2019. Junho began his military service on May 30, 2019 as a public service worker, while Chansung enlisted on June 11, 2019.

During the group's period of fulfilling their military service, JYP Entertainment and Epic Records Japan released two compilation albums in Japan. On September 18, 2019, the compilation album 2PM Best in Korea 2 ～2012–2017～, was released, consisting of 15 songs previously released in Korea from 2012 to 2017. The album peaked at number 7 on the Oricon Albums Chart and remained on the chart for three weeks. Then on March 13, 2020, the Japanese-language compilation album The Best of 2PM in Japan 2011–2016 was released, consisting of two CDs containing a total of 38 songs recorded between 2011 and 2016 previously released in Japan. Taking pre-order sales into consideration, the album topped the Oricon Albums Chart and Tower Records Daily Sales Chart upon release.

2020–present: End of military service and group comeback

Jun. K completed his military service and was discharged on January 2, 2020. Wooyoung was also discharged on February 25.  Chansung was discharged on January 5, 2021. It was announced in January 2021 that 2PM would make a full group comeback later in the year after Junho has completed his military service. Junho was discharged on March 20, completing 2PM's military services.  JYP Entertainment later announced that they would return with a new album sometime in the end of June.

On June 7, 2021, it was revealed that 2PM would be coming back with their seventh studio album Must. The album marked four years since their hiatus, and five years since the release of Gentleman's Game. Must was released on June 28 alongside its lead single "Make It," which was co-written by member Wooyoung.  The album's ten tracks borrowed elements from jazz and pop while maintaining 2PM's signature sweltering electronic sound. "The Cafe", on the other hand, utilizes pulsating 808 drumming for a familiar R&B inflection.

On September 29, 2021, 2PM released their Japanese EP With Me Again.

Other activities

Television hosting
In December 2008, 2PM began to host the third season of MBC's Idol Show (아이돌군단의 떴다!그녀). The segment ran from December 4, 2008 to March 26, 2009, with a total of seventeen episodes.

The group also starred in a reality show on Mnet titled Wild Bunny, in which the members escaped the pressures of stardom by performing ten forbidden activities of idols. The show ran from July 21 until September 1, 2009, with seven episodes aired. The airing of the final episode, which coincidentally featured the members engaged in a "Leader Olympics" game to select a new leader, was postponed indefinitely due to Jaebeom's internet controversy and his subsequent departure from the group.

In addition, Taecyeon and Wooyoung have been hosting SBS (Seoul Broadcasting System)'s weekly music show Inkigayo, while Jaebeom and Chansung have also made regular appearances on 'Introducing Star Friends'. Since Jaebeom was voted off, Nichkhun replaced his position as the guest. Nichkhun and Wooyoung were also frequent guests on SBS's variety talent show Star King between April and October 2009, with the other 2PM members occasionally joining them.

Endorsements
In March 2009, 2PM was selected to model for EXR, a clothing company in Korea. In July 2009, the members of 2PM were selected as the representatives of foreign artists by the Thai government-led tourism campaign, I Love Thailand. Member Nichkhun has also been selected by the Tourism Authority of Thailand (TAT) as the face of their newest campaign, "Come to Thailand; Let's Take a Break!"

In August 2009, 2PM collaborated with the Body Shop in 'Soft Hands, Kind Heart', a worldwide campaign that calls for the protection of children and teenagers against sex trafficking. The members will act as Korea's spokespeople for the campaign.

In late October 2009, a commercial film (CF) of 2PM promoting Hanami (a Thai snack company) was released, which also included Jaebeom; the commercial was said to be filmed prior to his departure in September.

November 2009 saw multiple new endorsement deals for the group, the first of which being a commercial and print campaign for Market O's "Real Brownie" pastry. Shortly thereafter, the group endorsed the Samsung Corby mobile phone, one of the newest mobile devices in Samsung's popular "Anycall" series, both on television and on the Samsung website. 2PM is also currently endorsing Paris-Croissant Food Company's Paris Baguette bakery franchise, for which the group recorded a special Christmas song and are featured in a series of commercials with popular Korean actress Kim Tae-hee.

In 2010, 2PM has signed on to endorse Coca-Cola as well as the clothing company SPRIS (also known as PONY). Members Nichkhun, Taecyeon, Minjun and Wooyoung endorse Cass Beer, and Nichkhun has continued advertising for the Suzuki Jelato motorcycle in Thailand. In addition, 2PM now endorses Calvin Klein South Korea, as well as, most recently, It's Skin, a South Korean cosmetics and skin care brand.

In mid-2010, 2PM were chosen along with Girls' Generation to be the spokesperson for Caribbean Bay. Shortly after, the members of 2PM (except for Nichkhun) were chosen to sing the song "Fly to Seoul (Boom Boom Boom)" to support tourism in Korea. Due to renewal of their endorsement deal with Samsung, 2PM recorded the song "Nori For U" for Samsung Anycall NORi.

In April 2021, following the group's return from their hiatus, 2PM became endorsers for sportswear brand Xexymix.

Discography

Korean albums
 01:59PM (2009)
 Hands Up (2011)
 Grown (2013)
 Go Crazy! (2014)
 No.5 (2015)
 Gentlemen's Game (2016)
 Must (2021)

Japanese albums
 Republic of 2PM (2011)
 Legend of 2PM (2013)
 Genesis of 2PM (2014)
 2PM of 2PM (2015)
 Galaxy of 2PM (2016)

Videography

Concert tours

World tours
 Go Crazy World Tour (2014)

Asia tours
 Hands Up Asia Tour (2011–2012)
 "What Time Is It?" Asia Tour (2012–2013)
 2PM Concert "House Party" (2015–2016)

Japan tours
 First Japan Tour: Take Off (2011)
 Republic of 2PM Tour (2011)
 Six Beautiful Days Tour (2012)
 Legend of 2PM (2013)
 Genesis of 2PM (2014)
 2PM of 2PM Tour (2015)
 2PM Six "Higher" Days Tour (2016)
 Galaxy of 2PM Tour (2016)

Awards

References

External links

  
 2PM Official Japan 

 
Articles which contain graphical timelines
JYP Entertainment artists
K-pop music groups
Melon Music Award winners
MAMA Award winners
Musical groups established in 2008
Musical groups from Seoul
Sony Music Entertainment Japan artists
South Korean boy bands
South Korean dance music groups
2008 establishments in South Korea